Vice Admiral Sandeep Naithani, AVSM, VSM is a serving Flag officer in the Indian Navy. He currently serves as the Chief of Materiel. He has earlier served as the Controller Warship Production and Acquisition from 2020 to 2021 and as the Admiral Superintendent Naval Dockyard (Mumbai) in 2018.

Early life and education
He hails from Pauri district of Uttarakhand and has done his schooling from the Government Model High School, Chandigarh and the Visakha Valley School in Visakhapatnam. He graduated from the National Defence Academy, Pune as part of the 65th course.

Naval career
Naithani was commissioned into the Electrical branch of the Indian Navy on 1 January 1985. He served three tenures on board the aircraft carrier I. Ashore, he has served in the Naval Dockyards at Mumbai and Visakhapatnam. At Naval Dockyard (Mumbai), he served as the Manager, Electrical and Power Systems. Subsequently, he served as the Assistant General Manager (Planning) at Naval Dockyard (Visakhapatnam).

Naithani has completed the staff course at the Defence Services Staff College, Wellington. He also holds a Master's degree in Radar and communication engineering from the Indian Institute of Technology, Delhi. He also attended the National Defence College, New Delhi.

Flag rank
On promotion to flag rank, Naithani was appointed Assistant Chief of Materiel (Modernisation) at Naval headquarters (NHQ). He then moved to the Western Naval Command as the Chief Staff Officer (Technical) to the Flag Officer Commanding-in-Chief Western Naval Command. In January 2018, he was appointed Admiral Superintendent of Naval Dockyard (Mumbai). Later that year, he was promoted to the rank of Vice Admiral and took over as the Director General Naval Projects, Mumbai.

For his tenure as Admiral Superintendent of Naval Dockyard Mumbai, Naithani was awarded the Ati Vishisht Seva Medal on 26 January 2019. He subsequently was appointed Programme Director of the Advanced Technology Vessel project. On 12 June 2019, Naithani took over as the Controller Warship Production & Acquisition (CWP&A) at NHQ, from Vice Admiral S. R. Sarma.

On 1 June 2021, he was appointed Chief of Materiel, a principal staff officer (PSO) at NHQ. He also is the Senior most Technical Officer in the Indian Navy.

Awards and decorations

Personal life
He is married to Manju Naithani and the couple has two daughters - Pyuli and Palek.

References 

Indian Navy admirals
Recipients of the Ati Vishisht Seva Medal
National Defence Academy (India) alumni
Living people
Year of birth missing (living people)
Chiefs of Materiel (India)
Recipients of the Vishisht Seva Medal
Defence Services Staff College alumni
National Defence College, India alumni